Atchison, Topeka and Santa Fe Railway Depot, or variations with Railroad or Station or Passenger and/or Freight  may refer to any one of many stations of the Atchison, Topeka and Santa Fe Railway.  These include:

in the United States (by state then city)
Claremont (Metrolink station), Claremont, California, also known as Atchison, Topeka, and Santa Fe Railroad Station
Santa Fe Depot (San Bernardino), San Bernardino, California, also known as Atchison, Topeka and Santa Fe Railway Passenger and Freight Depot
Atchison, Topeka and Santa Fe Passenger Depot (Colorado Springs, Colorado), listed on the National Register of Historic Places (NRHP) in Colorado
Santa Fe Railway Manzanola Depot, listed on the NRHP in Otero County, Colorado
Streator Station, former AT&SF station in Streator, Illinois
Atchison, Topeka and Santa Fe Passenger and Freight Complex Historic District, Fort Madison, Iowa, listed on the NRHP in Lee County, Iowa
Atchison, Topeka and Santa Fe Railway Depot (Dodge City, Kansas), listed on the National Register of Historic Places in Ford County, Kansas
Atchison, Topeka and Santa Fe Railroad Passenger Depot (Leavenworth, Kansas), listed on the National Register of Historic Places in Leavenworth County, Kansas
Madison Atchison, Topeka and Santa Fe Railroad Depot, Madison, Kansas, listed on the National Register of Historic Places in Greenwood County, Kansas
Strong City Atchison, Topeka, & Santa Fe Depot, Strong City, Kansas, listed on the National Register of Historic Places listings in Chase County, Kansas
Atchison, Topeka and Santa Fe Railway Depot (Gallup, New Mexico), listed on the National Register of Historic Places in McKinley County, New Mexico
Atchison, Topeka, and Santa Fe Railroad Depot (Los Lunas, New Mexico), listed on the National Register of Historic Places in Valencia County, New Mexico
Atchison, Topeka and Santa Fe Railway Depot (Magdalena, New Mexico), listed on the National Register of Historic Places in Socorro County, New Mexico

See also
Atchison, Topeka and Santa Fe Railway Company Depot and Locomotive No. 5000, Amarillo, Texas
Atchison, Topeka, and Santa Fe Railway Steam Locomotive No. 3751, Los Angeles, California
Atchison, Topeka, and Santa Fe Pratt Truss Bridge, Melvern, Kansas
Santa Fe Depot (disambiguation)